Zulkarnain Malik is a Singaporean footballer who plays for Woodlands Wellington FC, primarily in the Prime League as a defender.

Club career
Zulkarnain made his senior debut for Woodlands Wellington on 4 October 2011 in the Rams 0–2 defeat to Etoile FC, playing in the first half before he was replaced by Oswind Suriya at half time. 

As of 4 November 2012, Zulkarnain has made 5 senior appearances for Woodlands in the S.League, with 2 of those coming on as a substitute.

Club career statistics
 

All numbers encased in brackets signify substitute appearances.

References

1989 births
Living people
Singaporean footballers
Woodlands Wellington FC players
Singapore Premier League players
Association football defenders